The Justice and Reconciliation Party (abbr. СПП or SPP), formerly known as the Bosniak Democratic Union of Sandžak (abbr. БДЗС or BDZS), is a political party in Serbia, representing the Bosniak ethnic minority concentrated in the Sandžak region of Serbia.

History 
It contested the 2014 parliamentary elections as part of a joint list with the centrist Liberal Democratic Party (LDP) and centre-left Social Democratic Union (SDU), but the alliance received only 3.4% of the vote, failing to win a seat.

In the 2016 parliamentary elections it ran alone, winning two seats. The party officially changed its name from the Bosniak Democratic Union of Sandžak to the Justice and Reconciliation Party on December 23, 2017. Jahja Fehratović had led the party from its formation until this time; following the name change, Muamer Zukorlić was recognized as its leader.

Political positions 
SPP is Bosniak nationalist and advocates for minority rights for Bosniaks. Additionally, it promotes a conservative, and Islamist ideology.

Electoral performance

Parliamentary elections

Presidential elections

References 

2013 establishments in Serbia
Bosniak political parties
Bosniak political parties in Serbia
Bosniaks of Montenegro
Bosniaks of Serbia
Conservative parties in Montenegro
Conservative parties in Serbia
Political parties established in 2013
Political parties of minorities in Montenegro
Regionalist parties
Social conservative parties
Sunni Islamic political parties
Islamic political parties
Bosniak nationalism